Nily Rozic is a legislator from Queens, New York and a member of the New York State Assembly.

Rozic represents New York's 25th District, which spans the northeast portions of Queens, including the communities of Flushing, Queensboro Hill, Hillcrest, Fresh Meadows, Oakland Gardens, Bayside, and Douglaston.

Early life and education
Rozic was born in Jerusalem and raised in the United States. She is a graduate of Townsend Harris High School and New York University.

Career
Prior to her election, Rozic had been chief of staff to Assemblyman Brian Kavanagh.

2012 election
In 2012, Rory Lancman, the former Democratic representative of the 25th District, decided to vacate his assembly seat. Rozic defeated Jerry Iannece from Bayside in the Democratic Party primary. Rozic received 55.6 percent of the vote to Iannece's 44.4. In the 2012 general election, Rozic went on to defeat Conservative Party nominee William N. Garifal Jr., and Republican candidate Abe Fuchs in the November general.

2014 election
In the 2014 Assembly race, Rozic was unopposed in the Democratic primary. Rozic ran as the candidate of the Working Families Party and Independence Party. She was uncontested in the 2014 general election of the 25th Assembly District.

2016 election
Rozic, running for a third term in 2016, was unopposed in the Democratic primary. 
Rozic was challenged by Republican candidate Usman Ali Chohan in 2016. In the general election, Rozic won her third term with 76.36 percent of the vote (about 22,000 voters).

Committee appointments
She was appointed to serve on the Assembly's Children and Families, Corporations, Authorities and Commissions, Correction, Environmental Conservation, and Labor Committees.

She was also a member of the Black, Puerto Rican, Hispanic & Asian Legislative Caucus and the Puerto Rican/Hispanic Task Force.

She serves on the Assembly's Ways & Means, Labor, Environmental Conservation, Correction, and Corporations, Authorities and Commissions Committees. In 2017, Nily was named as chair of the Task Force on Women's Issues.

Awards and honors
In 2013, Rozic was named as a Rising Star on City & State's annual list of the Next Generation of Political Leaders for becoming an influential force in New York State politics as a young elected official.

Personal life 
Rozic lives in Fresh Meadows, Queens.

References

Living people
Democratic Party members of the New York State Assembly
Women state legislators in New York (state)
People from Queens, New York
21st-century American politicians
21st-century American women politicians
Townsend Harris High School alumni
New York University alumni
1986 births